For a list of all Bury players with a Wikipedia article, see :Category:Bury F.C. players.
This is a list of footballers who have played for Bury F.C. who have played 100 or more senior matches for the club.
 
Appearances and goals are for first-team competitive matches only. Wartime matches are regarded as unofficial and are excluded, as are matches from the abandoned 1939–40 season.

References 
 Post-war Football League Player statistics
 English National Football Archive
 Soccerbase stats

Players
 
Bury
Association football player non-biographical articles